Enoch W. Eastman (April 30, 1810 – January 9, 1885) was an American politician.

Born in Deerfield, New Hampshire, Enoch Worthen Eastman studied law in New Hampshire and was admitted to the bar. He then moved to Iowa. Although a Democrat, he distinguished himself the first year of his residence in Iowa by taking the stump against the adoption of the Constitution recently framed by his party and helped to defeat it at the election. Under this Constitution the boundaries of the State would have extended north taking in a large portion of southeastern Minnesota and would have excluded all of the Missouri slope west of a line running north and south from near the west side of Kossuth and Ringgold counties. Enoch W. Eastman, Theodore S. Parvin and Frederick D. Mills, all Democrats and young men, warmly opposed the adoption of such boundaries and influenced enough of their Democratic associates to unite with the Whigs to defeat the Constitution. This was one of the most important public services ever rendered the State. When Iowa was called upon to contribute a stone for the Washington monument in 1850, Enoch W. Eastman was the author of the inscription placed upon it: “Iowa—Her affections like the rivers of her borders, flow to an inseparable Union.” Mr. Eastman removed to Oskaloosa in 1847 and to Eldora in 1857. When the Civil War began he left the Democratic party and united with the Republicans.

Eastman was elected Lieutenant Governor of Iowa serving under Governor William M. Stone. In 1883, Eastman was elected to the Iowa State Senate and died while in office.

References

1810 births
1885 deaths
People from Deerfield, New Hampshire
New Hampshire lawyers
American Unitarians
Iowa state senators
Lieutenant Governors of Iowa
19th-century American politicians
19th-century American lawyers